Charles Mackinnon was one of the two MPs for Ipswich in the English parliament from 1827 to 1831.  He was a Tory.

References

Mackinnon
Tory MPs (pre-1834)